Hovk is a village in the Dilijan Municipality of the Tavush Province in Armenia. In 1988–1989 Armenian refugees from Azerbaijan settled in the village; refugees from Getashen, the villages of Shamkhor as well as from Martunashen (present-day Qarabulaq) resettled in the village.

Etymology
The village was originally known as Aghkikhlu. In 1978, it was renamed honor of Azeri poet and dramatist Samed Vurghun (1906-1956), a winner of the Lenin Prize. After the independence of Armenia, on April 3, 1991, by the decision of the Supreme Council of Armenia, Samed Vurghun was renamed Hovk.

Gallery

References

External links 

Populated places in Tavush Province